The Tashkent class (officially known as Project 20) consisted of a single destroyer leader, built in Italy for the Soviet Navy just before World War II. Three others were ordered from shipyards in the Soviet Union, but they were cancelled before they were laid down as they were too difficult to build with the existing technology in Soviet shipyards. Completed in 1939,  participated in the Sieges of Odessa and Sevastopol in 1941–1942, during which she ferried reinforcements and supplies into those cities, evacuated wounded and refugees, and provided naval gunfire support for Soviet troops. The ship was badly damaged twice by Axis bombers before she was sunk in harbor in mid-1942. Her wreck refloated in 1944, but it was too badly damaged to be worth repairing and was scrapped after the war.

Design and description
Unsatisfied with the  destroyer leader, the Soviets decided that they needed foreign design assistance around 1934–1935. The French were not willing to share ship plans so the Soviets turned to Italy, based on their earlier experience with the Italians during the preliminary design work for the s. They requested designs for a high-speed destroyer leader from three Italian shipbuilders and accepted the submission by Odero-Terni-Orlando (OTO) in September 1935. They would build the lead ship, named Tashkent, in their Livorno shipyard, and provide assistance for the Soviets to build others in their own shipyards. Three other ships were ordered, although the only ship to receive a name was Baku, before they were all cancelled due to difficulties with adapting the Italian design to Soviet shipbuilding practices. A total of eleven ships in the class were planned: three for the Baltic Fleet, two for the Black Sea Fleet, two for the Northern Fleet and four for the Pacific Fleet.

Their crew numbered 250 officers and sailors.

She reached  once her armament had been installed.

Armament and fire-control

Tashkents main armament was intended to consist of six 50-caliber  B-13 guns in three twin-gun B-2LM turrets, one superfiring pair forward of the superstructure and the other mount aft of it. However, the turrets were not ready in time so three single mounts were substituted. The manually operated mounts had an elevation range between -5° to +45° and had a rate of fire of 6–10 rounds per minute.

Anti-aircraft defense aboard Tashkent was designed to be provided by four 46-caliber semi-automatic  21-K AA guns in single mounts, but six weapons were actually installed, all of which were clustered around the aft funnel as well as six  DShK machine guns. The 21-K had a rate of fire of 25–30 rounds per minute with an elevation range between -10° and +85°.

The Tashkents carried nine  torpedo tubes in three rotating triple mounts amidships. The ships could also carry 76 mines and 24 depth charges which were delivered by two throwers and one stern rack.

Tashkent was equipped with a gunnery director on top of the bridge, fitted with a duplex rangefinder installation, that provided data for an Italian-made "Galileo" mechanical analog fire-control computer, and a  rangefinder. Two  rangefinders were provided for the AA guns. It is uncertain what fire-control systems would have been used by the Soviet-built ships had they not been canceled.

Modifications
During a brief refit in February 1941, the three B-2LM turrets were installed. At the same time the 45 mm guns were replaced by an equal number of fully automatic  70-K AA guns. They had a maximum elevation of +90° and a rate of fire of 160–180 rounds per minute.

A twin-gun 39-K mount for  34-K AA guns was fitted on her stern while Tashkent was under repair on 31 August; it had been originally intended for the destroyer  which was still under construction. The 34-K guns could elevate between -5° and +85° and had a rate of fire of 15–20 rounds per minute.

Ships

Service
During the Siege of Odessa, Tashkent escorted a transport to Odessa and provided naval gunfire support before she was badly damaged by Axis bombers in August. After repairs were completed in November, the ship ferried reinforcements and supplies, evacuated wounded and refugees, and bombarded Axis positions during the Siege of Sevastopol in 1941–1942. Tashkent was crippled by Axis bombers on a return voyage to Novorossiysk in late June and was sunk a few days later during an air strike on the harbor there. Her wreck was refloated in 1944, but it was a total constructive total loss and was scrapped after the war.

References

Bibliography

Further reading

External links

 page in Russian language

Destroyer classes
Destroyers of the Soviet Navy
 
World War II destroyers of the Soviet Union
Italy–Soviet Union relations
History of Tashkent
Ships built in Livorno